In enzymology, a (R)-6-hydroxynicotine oxidase is an enzyme that catalyzes the chemical reaction

(R)-6-hydroxynicotine + HO + O  1-(6-hydroxypyridin-3-yl)-4-(methylamino)butan-1-one + HO

The 3 substrates of this enzyme are (R)-6-hydroxynicotine, HO, and O, whereas its two products are 1-(6-hydroxypyridin-3-yl)-4-(methylamino)butan-1-one and HO.

This enzyme belongs to the family of oxidoreductases, specifically those acting on the CH-NH group of donors with oxygen as acceptor.  The systematic name of this enzyme class is (R)-6-hydroxynicotine:oxygen oxidoreductase. Other names in common use include D-6-hydroxynicotine oxidase, and 6-hydroxy-D-nicotine oxidase.  It employs one cofactor, FAD.

Structural studies

References

 
 

EC 1.5.3
Flavoproteins
Enzymes of known structure